Juan Alberto "Pepe" Schiaffino Villano (28 July 1925 – 13 November 2002) was an Italian-Uruguayan football player who played as an attacking midfielder or forward. A highly skilful and creative playmaker, at club level, he played for CA Peñarol in Uruguay, and for A.C. Milan, and Roma in Italy. At international level, he won the 1950 FIFA World Cup with the Uruguay national team, and also took part at the 1954 FIFA World Cup; he later also represented the Italy national football team.

He was ranked as the best Uruguayan footballer of all time by an IFFHS poll, and the 17th greatest player of the twentieth century.

Club career
Following his eight successful years in Peñarol in his native Uruguayan league, Schiaffino was purchased by Italian Serie A club A.C. Milan, for an at the time world record fee of 52 million Lire, in September 1954. He played 171 games with A.C. Milan and scored 60 goals, and participated in the 1958 European Cup Final, which Milan lost to Real Madrid 2–3 (aet). He was among the crucial offensive players in a Milan team that was dominated by foreign stars such as Nils Liedholm and Gunnar Nordahl. Schiaffino won three national championships with Milan, the victories being in 1955, 1957 and 1959. Schiaffino left in 1960 to join Roma, where he played out his career during two moderately successful seasons, in which Roma finished fifth in the standings.

International career
Schiaffino played for two national teams; first with the Uruguyan national team from 1946 to 1954, and later with the Italy national team from 1954 to 1958, courtesy of his paternal grandfather who was a Ligurian from the province of Genoa.

He earned 21 caps with the Uruguyan national team, scoring nine goals, and four caps with the Italy national team.

Schiaffino participated actively in Uruguay's victory in the 1950 World Cup, scoring one goal in the final and beating Brazil in its own stadium, in what was called the Maracanazo. He also played in the 1954 World Cup, helping his nation to a fourth-place finish in the tournament.

Style of play
A tactically versatile player, with a slender physique, Schiaffino was usually deployed as a left-sided inside forward or second striker in the early part of his career, in particular with CA Peñarol and A.C. Milan, or as an attacking midfielder, although he was also capable of playing as a deep-lying playmaker in midfield, a role which he occupied more frequently as his career progressed. Schiaffino was renowned for his creative ability and for having a unique capacity to read the game, organise his teammates, orchestrate goalscoring opportunities, and dictate the tempo of his team's play in midfield, which made him a highly proficient playmaker and assist provider; as a footballer, he was best known for his excellent technical ability, passing range, intelligence, positional sense, leadership, and vision. A well-rounded and hard-working player, who is regarded by pundits as one of the greatest footballers of all time, in addition to his skill, elegance, and creativity on the ball, Schiaffino was also known for his defensive contribution and willingness to track back, put pressure on opponents, and challenge them for the ball, often with sliding tackles; his wide range of skills also enabled him to play as a sweeper with Roma in his later career.

Death
Schiaffino died on 13 November 2002. His remains are buried at the Cementerio del Buceo, Montevideo.

Honours

Club
Peñarol
Primera División Uruguaya (Uruguayan championship): 1949, 1951, 1953, 1954

Milan
Serie A: 1954–55, 1956–57, 1958–59
Latin Cup: 1956

Roma
Inter-Cities Fairs Cup: 1961

International
Uruguay
FIFA World Cup: 1950

Individual
FIFA World Cup All-Star Team: 1950
IFFHS Uruguayan Player of the 20th Century
IFFHS South American Player of the 20th Century (6th place)
IFFHS Player of the 20th Century (17th place)
World Soccer: The 100 Greatest Footballers of All Time
A.C. Milan Hall of Fame
IFFHS Legends
FIFA World Cup Silver Ball (2nd Best Player): 1950
Latin Cup Top Goalscorer: 1956

References

External links

 
 Juan Alberto Schiaffino on RSSSF
 SuperFutbol profile

1925 births
2002 deaths
Italian footballers
Italy international footballers
Dual internationalists (football)
Uruguayan footballers
Peñarol players
A.C. Milan players
A.S. Roma players
Footballers from Montevideo
Uruguay international footballers
FIFA World Cup-winning players
1950 FIFA World Cup players
1954 FIFA World Cup players
Uruguayan expatriate footballers
Uruguayan Primera División players
Serie A players
Uruguayan football managers
Uruguay national football team managers
Uruguayan people of Italian descent
Peñarol managers
Burials at Cementerio del Buceo, Montevideo
People of Ligurian descent
1975 Copa América managers
Association football forwards